Paleo-orthodoxy (from Ancient Greek παλαιός "ancient" and Koine Greek ὀρθοδοξία "correct belief") is a Protestant Christian theological movement in the United States which emerged in the late 20th and early 21st centuries and which focuses on the consensual understanding of the faith among the ecumenical councils and Church Fathers. While it understands this consensus of the Church Fathers as orthodoxy proper, it calls itself paleo-orthodoxy to distinguish itself from neo-orthodoxy, a movement that was influential among Protestant churches in the mid-20th century.

Background
Paleo-orthodoxy attempts to see the essentials of Christian theology in the consensus of the Great Church before the schism between the Orthodox Church and the Catholic Church (the East-West Schism of 1054) and before the separation of Protestantism from the Roman Catholic Church (the Protestant Reformation of 1517), described in the canon of Vincent of Lérins as "" ("What [is believed] everywhere, always and by everyone"). Adherents of paleo-orthodoxy often form part of the Convergence Movement, though paleo-orthodoxy is not exclusive to the movement. Paleo-orthodox Protestants have different interpretations of the early Church's teachings.

Paleo-orthodox theologians
The dominant figure of the movement, United Methodist theologian Thomas C. Oden of Drew University, published a series of books not only calling for a return to "classical Christianity" but also providing the tools to do so. The 2002 collection of essays in honor of Oden, Ancient and Postmodern Christianity: Paleo-Orthodoxy in the 21st Century (Kenneth Tanner, Christopher Alan Hall, eds.) offers a glimpse into the work of some of the theologians active in this area: Robert Jenson, Christopher Hall, Amy Oden, Bradley Nassif, David Mills, Robert Webber, Geoffrey Wainwright, Carl Braaten, Stanley Grenz, John Franke, Alan Padget, Wolfhart Pannenberg, Richard John Neuhaus, et al. Similar approaches emerge in the theology of Marva Dawn (a Lutheran); Alister McGrath (a Church of England Reformed evangelical); Andrew Purves (a Presbyterian); Timothy George (Baptist); and Christopher Hall (an Episcopalian); J. Davila-Ashcraft (Evangelical Episcopal Communion); and Emilio Alvarez (founding Archbishop of the Union of Charismatic Orthodox Churches).

See also 
 Restorationism
 Old Catholicism

References

Further reading 
Among Oden's works, either as writer or editor, in support of paleo-orthodoxy are:
 Thomas Oden: Agenda for Theology, later re-published as After Modernity...What?, 
 Thomas Oden, General editor: Ancient Christian Commentary on Scripture that Oden describes as a multi-volume patristic commentary on Scripture by the fathers of the church spanning the era from Clement of Rome (fl. c. 95) to John of Damascus (c.645-c.749). –  Detailed information about the set can be found at the publisher.
 Thomas Oden: John Wesley's Scriptural Christianity: A Plain Exposition of His Teaching on Christian Doctrine, 
 Thomas Oden: Pastoral Theology: Essentials of Ministry, 
 Thomas Oden: The Rebirth of Orthodoxy: Signs of New Life in Christianity, 
 Thomas Oden: Requiem: A Lament in Three Movements, 
 Thomas Oden: Systematic Theology (three volumes... The Living God, The Word of Life and Life in the Spirit, republished in one volume as Classic Christianity)

Works by other authors:
 Christopher Hall and Kenneth Tanner (eds.): Ancient & Postmodern Christianity: Paleo-Orthodoxy in the 21st Century (Essays In Honor of Thomas C. Oden), .
 Christopher A. Hall: Reading Scripture with the Church Fathers
 Colleen Carroll: The New Faithful: Why Young Adults Are Embracing Christian Orthodoxy
 Richard Foster Streams of Living Water: Celebrating the Great Traditions of Christian Faith )

External links
 Thomas Oden's Paleo-Orthodoxy by Eric Landstrom

Protestant ecumenism
Christian terminology
Christian theological movements